The grey-sided scimitar babbler (Erythrogenys swinhoei) is a species of bird in the family Timaliidae. It is found in southern China. Its natural habitats are subtropical or tropical moist lowland forest and subtropical or tropical moist montane forest.

References

Collar, N. J. & Robson, C. 2007. Family Timaliidae (Babblers)  pp. 70 – 291 in; del Hoyo, J., Elliott, A. & Christie, D.A. eds. Handbook of the Birds of the World, Vol. 12. Picathartes to Tits and Chickadees. Lynx Edicions, Barcelona.

grey-sided scimitar babbler
Birds of South China
Endemic birds of China
grey-sided scimitar babbler